UAM or Uam may refer to:

Universities
Arturo Michelena University (Universidad Arturo Michelena), Valencia, Venezuela 
Autonomous University of Madrid (Universidad Autonóma de Madrid), Spain
Universidad Autónoma Metropolitana, Mexico
University Art Museum, Santa Barbara, University of California, Santa Barbara, U.S.
University of Arkansas at Monticello, Monticello, Arkansas, U.S.
Adam Mickiewicz University (Uniwersytet im. Adama Mickiewicza), Poznań, Poland
University of Agriculture, Makurdi, Nigeria

Computing 

Universal Access Method, an authentication method for a WiFi or wired network

 User activity monitoring
 Unified access management

Other uses
African and Malagasy Union (Union Africaine et Malgache)
The French Union of Modern Artists (Union des Artistes Moderne)
Uam, a 2009 album by Scottish musician Julie Fowlis
Ultrasonic additive manufacturing, an additive manufacturing technology
Unión Atlético Maracaibo, a Venezuelan professional football team
The IATA code and FAA identifier for Andersen Air Force Base, Guam
The Indian Railways station code for Udhagamandalam railway station, Ooty, Tamil Nadu
Urban Air Mobility (Transportation)
United Aborigines Mission, a Christian mission in Australian that ran residential institutions for Aboriginal children